Ethmia terpnota is a moth in the family Depressariidae. It is found in Costa Rica, where it occurs at middle elevations on both slopes of Cordillera Volcánica de Guanacaste, Tilarán, Cordillera Volcánica Central and Talamanca. The habitat consists of rain forests.

The ground color of the forewings is white. The ground color of the hindwings is white, becoming pale brownish at apical margins. Adults are on wing in March and from October to November.

References

Moths described in 1912
terpnota